Mosteiros is a concelho (municipality) of Cape Verde. Situated in the northeastern part of the island of Fogo, it covers 19% of the island area, and is home to 26% of its population. Its seat is the city Mosteiros (Igreja). Its population was 9,524 at the 2010 census, and its area is 89.45 km2.

Subdivisions
The municipality consists of one freguesia (civil parish), Nossa Senhora da Ajuda. The freguesia is subdivided into the following settlements (populations in 2010):

Achada Grande (pop: 538)
Atalaia (pop: 700)
Corvo (pop: 340)
Cova Feijoal (pop: 217)
Cutelo Alto (pop: 281)
Fajãzinha (pop: 84)
Feijoal (pop: 435)
Mosteiros (or Igreja) (pop: 4,124, city)
Mosteiros Tras (pop: 37)
Pai António (pop: 545)
Relva (pop: 1,184)
Ribeira do Ilhéu (pop: 848)
Rocha Fora (pop: 187)

Geography
Mosteiros is situated between the northeastern slopes of the volcano Pico do Fogo and the Atlantic Ocean. The southwestern part of the municipality lies within Fogo Natural Park, which includes the Monte Velha Forest. Mosteiros is an agricultural area, its main product is coffee.

History
The municipality Mosteiros was created in January 1992, when the older Municipality of Fogo was split in two, the southwestern part becoming the Municipality of São Filipe and the northeastern part becoming the Municipality of Mosteiros.

Demography

The literacy rate is 82.6%. 30.5% of the population are under the age of 15.

Politics
Since 2004, the African Party for the Independence of Cape Verde (PAICV) is the ruling party of the municipality. The results of the latest elections, in 2016:

Twin towns

 Azambuja, Portugal
 Entroncamento, Portugal
 Haría, Spain

External links
 Official website
 ANMCV (Associação Nacional dos Municípios Cabo-Verdianos - National Association of the Capeverdean Municipalities)

References

 
Municipalities of Cape Verde
Geography of Fogo, Cape Verde
1991 establishments in Cape Verde